Some mortgage lenders, particularly in the United Kingdom, give a one-off lump sum payment to new borrowers at the beginning of a mortgage. Called cashback, this lump sum is often marketed as free cash, but it is in fact funded by the mortgage interest paid by the borrower.

Amount
The size of the lump sum is dependent on the size of the mortgage and is usually offered only on certain mortgages in a mortgage lender's range. 

Cashback on mortgages is popular with first time buyers, who put the cashback towards buying furniture , as these types of buyers often do not have any surplus funds after paying the deposit on their new home.

See also
 Equity loan
 Mortgage Loan
 Reverse Mortgage

Cashback and rebate
Mortgage